Tracsis plc offers technologies to manage, monitor, and optimize resources in the railway and wider transport industry. The company is headquartered in Leeds, UK, and listed on the London Stock Exchange.

Products and services 

Originally focused on software to help railway operators manage their operations, such as vehicle and crew scheduling, resource management, and monitoring, it has expanded to cover ticketing, data analytics, and event management for the wider transport industry. The product offering is primarily UK-centric, but with increasingly international offerings.

Clients include Network Rail and bus and train operating companies such as Go-Ahead Group and FirstGroup.

History 

The company was created as a spin-out of the Computing Department of the University of Leeds, and rapidly grew through expansion. The company's first acquisition, Robert Watson Associates, was larger than Tracsis at the time and was spun-out of Loughborough University.

Acquisitions

Management 

The company was led by John McArthur from 2005. In 2016, he sold a tenth of his holding in the company.

In 2019, he was succeeded by Chris Barnes, who was previously head of automotive consulting at Ricardo plc.

Stock market 

The company has been on the AIM market since November 2007.

Some market observers have described it as a business with an economic moat, due to the complexity of the product and the friction costs customers face if they wish to switch to a competitor.

In 2014 it won the Growth business of the Year Award from UK Tech Awards

References 

Organisations based in Leeds
2004 establishments in the United Kingdom